is Pink Lady's fourth single release, released on June 10, 1977, with a total of 1,450,000 sales, This single stayed at the number-one spot for eight weeks.

According to Oricon, this was the best selling single of 1977.

The song's dance choreography uses a beach motif, with emphasis on swimming and surfing.

A re-recorded version of the song was included on the two-disc greatest hits release, INNOVATION, released in December 2010.

Track listing (7" vinyl) 
All lyrics are written by Yū Aku; all music is composed and arranged by Shunichi Tokura.

Track listing (1993 CD single release) 
Released on September 22, 1993.
 "Nagisa no Sindbad" 2:35
 "S.O.S." 2:45
 "Nagisa no Sindbad" (Original Karaoke)
 "S.O.S." (Original Karaoke)

Track listing (1996 Remix CD single release) 
Released on August 21, 1996.
 "Nagisa no Sindbad" (Original Version)
 "Nagisa no Sindbad" (Remix)
 "Nagisa no Sindbad" (Original Karaoke)

Chart positions

Pink Babies version

The 10-member tribute group Pink Babies covered the song on August 31, 2016 as their first physical release, with "Lady X" as the B-side. Four versions of the single were offered; each one includes two different songs.

A limited edition single titled "Le Sinbad de la plage" was sold exclusively at Japan Expo in Paris, France on July 2–5, 2015. The single includes "Armée de papaye" ("Papaya Gundan") and "Inspecteur Pepper" ("Pepper Keibu").

Track listings 
All lyrics are written by Yū Aku; all music is composed by Shunichi Tokura.

Chart positions

Other cover versions
 The song was performed live by Chisato Moritaka as part of her Pink Lady Medley in the concert video Moritaka Land Tour 1990.3.3 at NHK Hall, released on Blu-ray in 2013.
 Megumi Yuki covered the song in 1990.
 Powerviolence band Romantic Gorilla recorded a short and fast cover of this song which includes only the first phrase and the first chorus. It appeared on the 1993 demo tape and rerecorded for the 1996 Split album with Spazz.
 Trasparenza covered the song in their 2002 album Pink Lady Euro Tracks.
 Idol duo W covered the song in their 2004 debut album Duo U&U. 
 The song was covered on Maximum The Hormone's second maxi single NIKU CUP.
 Keiko Masuda self-covered the song in her 2008 covers album  and her 2012 compilation album Colors ~ 30th Anniversary All Time Best.
 Japanese rock band GO!GO!7188 also covered it for their 2008 album Tora no Ana 2.
 Ayano Tsuji released a cover of this song on her album Cover Girl 2, released in 2008.
 Morning Musume included the song in their first cover album Cover You in 2009.
 Twin sisters ManaKana released a cover of this song on their cover album Futari Uta from 2009.
 Watarirouka Hashiritai recorded a cover version for the 2009 Pink Lady/Yū Aku tribute album Bad Friends.
 Amiaya incorporated the song as part of their "Pink Lady Mash Up 2015" single.
 Meimi Tamura covered the song in her 2020 DVD CLIP&COVERS.

References

External links
 
 

1977 singles
1977 songs
2016 singles
Pink Lady (band) songs
Japanese-language songs
Disco songs
Surf songs
Oricon Weekly number-one singles
Songs with lyrics by Yū Aku
Songs with music by Shunichi Tokura
Victor Entertainment singles